Bogdan Alexandru Ungurușan (born 20 February 1983) is a Romanian former footballer who plays as a right back. In his career Ungurușan played for: Armătura Zalău, Universitatea Cluj, Pandurii Târgu Jiu, FC Botoșani and Victoria Cluj.

Honours

Club
Pandurii
Liga I: runner-up 2013

References

External links
 
 
 

1981 births
Living people
People from Zalău
Romanian footballers
Association football defenders
Liga I players
Liga II players
FC Universitatea Cluj players
CS Pandurii Târgu Jiu players
FC Botoșani players
Victoria Cluj players